Connie Mulder, born Cornelius Petrus Mulder (5 June 1925– 12 January 1988), was a South African politician, cabinet minister and father of Pieter Mulder, former leader of the Freedom Front Plus.

He started his career as a teacher of Afrikaans, German and History at the Randgate Afrikaansmediumskool and obtained his PhD from Witwatersrand University. Mulder had four children. Two of his children, Pieter and Corné Mulder, followed their father into politics. After the 2009 general election, both sons served in the National Assembly of South Africa as Members of Parliament for the Freedom Front Plus. Pieter later resigned as M.P. and party leader in November 2016.

Political career

Mayor
In 1951 he was appointed member of the city council of Randfontein and immediately elected deputy mayor and chairman of the finance committee of the city council. In 1953 (at age 28) he was elected mayor of Randfontein and two years later in 1955 was elected President of the Transvaal Municipal Association. In 1957 he was elected mayor again and he was a member of the United Municipal Executive of South Africa for four years.

Parliament
Mulder was elected to the legislature in 1958 as a National Party member. John Vorster named him Information Minister in 1968. In 1977, he was implicated as namesake of the Muldergate Scandal, in which he was accused of having established a government slush fund for financing The Citizen to bolster support for Vorster's regime among English-speaking South Africans.

In January 1978, he was appointed Minister of Plural Relations and Development.

Though the scandal eventually brought about Vorster's downfall and complete retirement from politics, Mulder lost the ballot to succeed him in September 1978. He barely lost in the first round to Pieter Willem Botha in a narrow 72-78 vote. In the second round, he lost with a comfortable 98 votes to 74, in Botha's favour. This was because 20 supporters of foreign minister Pik Botha (the third candidate in the race) threw their support to P.W. Botha, and only two to Mulder. Mulder was subsequently retained in Botha's reshuffling of the government. However, the Information Scandal stories started appearing in the media, which led to his resignation as Minister on 8 November 1978.

Following his expulsion from the National Party in the wake of the Information Scandal, Mulder and his followers formed the National Conservative Party. However, all of the party's nine candidates were defeated at the 1981 general election. Mulder himself lost by 922 votes in the constituency of Randfontein, where he had won in the 1977 election with a majority of 7,763.

After the founding of the Conservative Party, in which he participated, Mulder was elected to the House of Assembly at the 1987 general election, at the age of 62. By then suffering from terminal cancer, he died on 12 January 1988 before he was able to take his seat.

His two sons, Pieter and Corné, became Conservative Party MPs in 1988. Corné still serve in Parliament as a member of Freedom Front Plus.

References

1925 births
1988 deaths
People from Bela-Bela Local Municipality
Afrikaner people
South African people of Dutch descent
National Party (South Africa) politicians
Conservative Party (South Africa) politicians
Ministers of Home Affairs of South Africa
Members of the House of Assembly (South Africa)